George Frederic Bahnson ( – ) was a Danish-born bishop of the Moravian Church in America.

He was educated at the Moravian college and the theological seminary in Germany, and in 1829 emigrated to the United States and entered the boarding-school at Nazareth, Pa., as a tutor. Five years later he began his ministerial career. The two churches in which he labored longest and with most success were those at Lancaster, Pa., and Salem, N. C. He was consecrated to the episcopacy at Bethlehem, 13 May 1860, and presided over the southern district. In 1869 he went to Europe to attend the general synod of the Moravian church, and in the course of the journey his health failed, and he died a few weeks after his return.George Frederic Bahnson died on 11 September 1869 in Salem.

External links
 

Created via preloaddraft
1805 births
1869 deaths
19th-century Moravian bishops